The Miscast Nunataks are a group of four nunataks which rise to  on the south side of Byrd Glacier in Antarctica. The outcrops lie between Mount Tadpole and Mount Madison in the Churchill Mountains. To their East is Couzens Saddle. The feature was geologically mapped as Dick Formation, a clastic, sandstone unit, by the New Zealand Geological Survey in 1960–61. The current name arose following remapping by United States Antarctic Program geologist Edmund Stump in 2000–01, and the determination that the entire outcrop is not sandstone but Shackleton Limestone.

References

Nunataks of Oates Land